No Place for Bravery is a 2D top-down action role-playing video game developed by the studio Glitch Factory and published by Ysbryd Games. The game was released for Microsoft Windows and Nintendo Switch on September 22, 2022.

The game was developed by a Brazilian studio, its combat style is inspired by Sekiro. Narrative is focused on Thron, a man tormented by nightmares from the past who risks a dangerous adventure to save his kidnapped daughter.

Reception 
On the review aggregator website Metacritic, the game received a score of 70 out of 100 based on 12 reviews for Switch version and 66 out of 100 based on 8 reviews for Windows version.

Khee Hoon wrote to Polygon that the game "revels in the violence and harshness of its battles". The editor criticized the game's excessive violence and also the difficulty of the battles: "It feels as if developer Glitch Factory drew the wrong lessons from the oeuvre of Dark Souls creator Hidetaka Miyazaki, an entire genre of games that thrive on challenging combat but still remain technically fair".

References 

Video games developed in Brazil
2022 video games
Action role-playing video games
Top-down video games
Nintendo Switch games
Windows games